GERAN is an abbreviation for GSM EDGE Radio Access Network. The standards for GERAN are maintained by the 3GPP (Third Generation Partnership Project). GERAN is a key part of GSM, and also of combined UMTS/GSM networks.

GERAN is the radio part of GSM/EDGE together with the network that joins the base stations (the Ater and Abis interfaces) and the base station controllers (A interfaces, etc.) The network represents the core of a GSM network, through which phone calls and packet data are routed from and to the PSTN and Internet to and from subscriber handsets. A mobile phone operator's network comprises one or more GERANs, coupled with UTRANs in the case of a UMTS/GSM network.

A GERAN without EDGE is a GRAN, but is otherwise identical in concept.

A GERAN without GSM is an ERAN.

See also 
UTRAN : UMTS Terrestrial Radio Access Network

References

External links 
3GPP GERAN Plenary page

GSM standard